Tom Müller (born 27 November 1997) is a German professional footballer who plays as a goalkeeper for Regionalliga West club Preußen Münster. He has previously played for Hallescher FC and Carl Zeiss Jena.

Club career
Born in Dessau, Müller played youth football for SG Empor Waldersee and SV Dessau 05 before joining Hallescher FC's academy in 2009. In summer 2015, Müller signed his first professional contract with the club until summer 2018. He made his debut for the club on 1 August 2017 as a 63rd-minute substitute for injured goalkeeper Oliver Schnitzler in a 2–0 defeat to Carl Zeiss Jena. In October 2017, having saved a penalty earlier in the match, Müller headed in a 95th-minute equaliser in the club's 1–1 draw with Rot-Weiss Erfurt, becoming the fourth goalkeeper to score in the 3. Liga. He made 22 appearances in total during the 2017–18 3. Liga. In April 2018, Halle took up the option to extend Müller's contract by a year to summer 2019. Having failed to make an appearance during the following season, his contract at Halle was extended by two years to summer 2021 in April 2019. He played twice during the 2019–20 season and failed to appear during the following season.

Müller joined Regionalliga Nordost club Carl Zeiss Jena on a one-year contract in summer 2021. He made 22 appearances during the 2021–22 season. In June 2022, Müller signed for Regionalliga West club Preußen Münster.

International career
Müller was called up to the Germany under-18 squad in 2014.

References

External links
 

1997 births
Living people
People from Dessau-Roßlau
Footballers from Saxony-Anhalt
German footballers
Association football goalkeepers
Hallescher FC players
FC Carl Zeiss Jena players
SC Preußen Münster players
3. Liga players
Regionalliga players